Türi Radio Mast was a radio mast in Türi, Estonia.

The mast's height was 196.6 m. It was built between 1936 and 1937 by the US company Electric Transmission Ltd.

The mast was destroyed in 1941 by Soviet troops to impede the movement of German troops.

See Also
 List of tallest structures in Estonia
 Lattice tower

References

Towers completed in 1937
Communication towers in Estonia
Buildings and structures in Järva County
1937 establishments in Estonia
1941 disestablishments in Estonia
Buildings and structures demolished in 1941